The 22701 / 22702 Visakhapatnam–Vijayawada Uday Express is a  Double-decker AC chair Car train of the Indian Railways connecting  in Andhra Pradesh and  in Andhra Pradesh. It is currently being operated with 22701/22702 train numbers on Five Days a week. It operates at an average speed of 65 km/h.

Coach composition

Utkrisht Double Decker Air Conditioned Yatri Express will be double-decker trains with 40% additional passenger capacity. They will run  on busy route by Indian Railways with features of LED screen display to show information about stations, train speed etc. and will have announcement system as well, Vending machines for tea, coffee and milk, Bio toilets in compartments as well as CCTV cameras.

UDAY Express has a total of 11 coaches; 3 coaches with Dining facility with seating capacity of 104 Seats each and 5 coaches without dining with seating capacity of 120 seats. The remaining two will be power cars.

Service

It averages 65 km/hr as 22701 Uday Express starts from Visakhapatnam, covering 350 km in 5 hrs 30 mins & 61 km/hr as 22702 Uday Express starts from Vijayawada, covering 350 km in 5 hrs 30 min.

Route & halts

Traction
Both trains are hauled by a Visakhapatnam-based WAP-7 locomotive on its entire journey.

See also

 Visakhapatnam–Tirupati Double Decker Express
 Uday Express

References

External links 

 22701 VSKP BZA Uday Express India Rail Info
 22702 BZA VSKP Uday Express India Rail Info

Uday Express trains
Transport in Vijayawada
Transport in Visakhapatnam
Rail transport in Andhra Pradesh
Railway services introduced in 2019